Zygmunt Witalis Zaremba (born 1895, Piotrków, Poland – died 5 October 1967, Sceaux, France), pseudonyms Andrzej Czarski (Czerski), Wit Smrek, was a Polish socialist activist and publicist.

Biography

Zaremba was a member of the Youth Association for Progress and Independence (Związek Młodzieży Postępowo-Niepodległościowej; 1911), Polish Socialist Party - Opposition (Polska Partia Socjalistyczna - Opozycja; 1912–1914), then was a member of the Polish Socialist Party (Polska Partia Socjalistyczna) and its Central Executive Committee (Centralny Komitet Wykonawczy; 1917–1918).

From 1918 onward, he stayed in Poland. Then, he became a member of Polish Socialist Party authorities – Supreme Council (Rada Naczelna; 1919–1939) and Central Executive Committee (1921–1924, 1926–1939). During the years of 1921–1924 he was a vice-president of its Supreme Council.

From 1922–35, he was a deputy in the Sejm. During the invasion of Poland in 1939, he organised the Robotnicza Brygada Obrony Warszawy. Zaremba was a co-founder of conspiratory Polish Socialist Party - Freedom-Equality-Independence (PPS - Wolność-Równość-Niepodległość).

From 1944–45, he was a representative of the Council of National Unity (Rada Jedności Narodowej). In 1946, he moved to Paris, where he became a president of the Central Committee (Rada Centralna) of the Polish Socialist Party. In 1949, he co-founded Political Council (Rada Polityczna) in London. He was a president and co-founder of the International Socialist Office and then, until 1964, president of the Central-East Socialist Europe Union.

Zaremba was a co-author of Program Polski Ludowej (1941). He edited Robotnik, Pobudka, and Związkowiec, as well as the journals Światło (1947–1959) and Droga (1959–1960).

Notable works

References

External links
 Zygmunt Zaremba at WorldCat

1895 births
1967 deaths
People from Piotrków Trybunalski
People from Piotrków Governorate
Polish Socialist Party politicians
Members of the Sejm of the Second Polish Republic (1922–1927)
Members of the Sejm of the Second Polish Republic (1928–1930)
Members of the Sejm of the Second Polish Republic (1930–1935)
Polish publicists
Recipients of the Cross of Valour (Poland)
Polish emigrants to France